Inside the NFL is an American weekly television sports show that focuses on the National Football League (NFL). It originally aired on HBO from 1977 through 2008. Following Super Bowl XLII, HBO announced that it would be dropping the program, and it was subsequently picked up by the Showtime network. In February 2021, it was announced that the show would move to Paramount+.

Each NFL season, the program airs from Week 1 of the regular season until the week after the Super Bowl. The show principally features highlights of the past week's games that were captured by NFL Films, in addition to commentary and analysis by the hosts, and occasional interviews with current and former NFL players and personnel.

History
Inside the NFL first aired in 1977 and is cable television's longest-running series. The first episode followed San Diego Chargers quarterback Rhett Swanson from his final college pass at USC to draft day. This concept was later copied by ESPN. The show is significant for being the first major sports-related program to air on the then relatively new HBO network. Perhaps more significant is the fact that it was the first NFL-related program to air on cable. The original hosts were Al Meltzer, at the time play-by-play man for the Buffalo Bills, and Chuck Bednarik, Pro Football Hall of Fame two-way player for the Philadelphia Eagles.

1978–2001
In 1978, Meltzer and Bednarik left the show and were replaced by Merle Harmon and Hall of Fame quarterback Len Dawson respectively. In 1980, Merle Harmon left for NBC as Len Dawson was joined by fellow Hall of Famer and former Miami Dolphins linebacker Nick Buoniconti. In 1989, newly retired Cris Collinsworth joined as an on-air reporter. In 1990, Collinsworth joined Dawson and Buoniconti as the third host. Several former players and coaches served as co-host throughout this period including Jimmy Johnson and Jerry Glanville.

From 1999 to 2001, the hosts of Inside the NFL appeared on HBO's corporate cousin, Cartoon Network, hosting faux pregame shows for the network's Big Game specials (featuring classic theatrical cartoons edited together as a parody of the Super Bowl).

End of the Dawson–Buoniconti era
After the 2001 NFL season, Len Dawson and Nick Buoniconti retired from the show. From 2002–2007 seasons, the show was hosted by Bob Costas with former players Dan Marino, Cris Collinsworth, and Cris Carter serving as co-hosts. Bob Costas acknowledged this change in the season's first episode and paid tribute to the former hosts, saying they paved the way for the show to succeed. In addition to the change in hosts, Inside the NFL also featured segments featuring comics such as George Lopez, Jim Florentine, Lewis Black and Wanda Sykes.

During the last three weeks of the 2005 NFL season, Real Sports host Bryant Gumbel filled in for Bob Costas. Costas was unavailable because he was in Turin, Italy preparing to cover the 2006 Winter Olympics for NBC.

In a special 30th anniversary episode that aired in December 2006, Len Dawson and Nick Buoniconti were invited back to co-host the show.

Cancellation, rebirth, and move to Showtime and Paramount+
On February 6, 2008, HBO suddenly announced that the show would end its run after 30 seasons. HBO Sports cited increased competition in NFL-related programming since the show's inception as a reason for its cancellation. Skeptics, however, believe that the real reason for HBO's decision to drop the show was due to the increasing cost for usage of the NFL Films produced highlights. In the final episode, a taped montage with highlights from the series' 30 seasons was aired. In addition, former hosts Dawson and Buoniconti did the final signoff as the credits rolled. Bob Costas soon regarded the cancellation by HBO as being a "boneheaded" move.

On June 3, 2008, CBS Sports and NFL Films announced that Inside the NFL had found a new home on CBS Corporation-owned Showtime and would air on Wednesdays starting September 10 (9 p.m. ET/PT) on the cable channel. Inside the NFL aired every Wednesday throughout the 2008 NFL season through Wednesday, February 11, 2009. It is produced by CBS Sports and NFL Films. On July 6, it was announced that James Brown would host Inside the NFL, the role Bob Costas had on HBO. Brown would also be joined by lead CBS NFL analyst Phil Simms, retired former Defensive Player of the Year Warren Sapp and the returning Cris Collinsworth.  Jenn Brown joined the team as the first female special correspondent on the show.  Her main responsibility would be to do various features throughout the season.  While Sapp was competing on Dancing with the Stars, former Pittsburgh Steelers head coach and current NFL Today analyst Bill Cowher along with former Washington Redskins quarterback Joe Theismann filled in.

As of the 2019 NFL season, the show is hosted by James Brown, Phil Simms, Brandon Marshall, and Ray Lewis.

On February 24, 2021, it was announced that Inside the NFL would move from Showtime to Paramount+, with former Patriots wide receiver Julian Edelman also becoming a part of the series. The season premiered on September 7, 2021.

Format
Much like other shows on pay-cable networks and streaming providers, Inside the NFL has the freedom to stray from the traditional network format for its program. While the basic elements were the same as any other sports recap show by featuring highlights of the week's games and discussion of events around the league, the fact that there were no commercials allows the panel to discuss subjects at length without the normal network time restrictions.

Highlights
The highlight segments consist of NFL Films footage of the past week's games with narration by Harry Kalas (following Kalas' death in 2009, Scott Graham took over as the narrator). This has long been considered a major asset of the show as the game highlights usually exceed the typical 15–30-second token package seen on most major networks. This was the case at least until the NFL Network emerged during the 2003 season and aired shows such as the show Point After that showed extended highlight segments.

In the last few years of Inside the NFL, the show decreased its highlight segments, eliminating some low-profile games.

Interviews
Aside from the highlights, Inside the NFL features in-depth interview segments with various players, coaches and front office personnel. Among the notable segments over the years was Cris Carter interviewing former coach Buddy Ryan. Ryan was Carter's first head coach when both were with the Philadelphia Eagles in the late 1980s and early 1990s. Ryan released Carter with his explanation being the infamous quote "All he does is catch touchdowns." The interview revealed what some had learned over the years, that Ryan released Carter because of his substance abuse problems that were affecting his performance but did not want that to become public, lest it hinder Carter's chances to sign with another team. Carter admitted that his release was a wake-up call and saved his life as he became a born again Christian soon after, and went on to have a successful NFL career with the Minnesota Vikings in which he became the NFL's second-leading receiver of all-time.

Production

HBO
The show was taped in a New York City studio on Wednesday and aired at various times throughout the week beginning Wednesday nights at 10 p.m. Eastern Time.

Showtime
The show is taped at NFL Films' headquarters in Mount Laurel, New Jersey on Tuesday and aired at various times throughout the week beginning Tuesday nights at 9 p.m. Eastern Time.  Greg Gumbel was replaced in September 2015 by Adam Schein of CBS Sports, with Brown returning in 2016 as host and Schein taking a supporting role.

References

External links
 
 

1977 American television series debuts
1980s American television series
1990s American television series
2000s American television series
2010s American television series
2020s American television series
American sports television series
American television series revived after cancellation
HBO original programming
Showtime (TV network) original programming
National Football League television series
NFL Films
HBO Sports
CBS Sports
English-language television shows
HBO Shows (series) WITHOUT Episode info, list, or Article
Paramount+ original programming